The Al-Faruq Mosque is a mosque in Vega Alta, Puerto Rico. It is the largest mosque in the island.

History
The mosque was built in 1992 and opened as the second mosque in the island.

Architecture
The mosque is the largest one in Puerto Rico. It has a capacity of 1,200 male worshipers and 120 female worshipers.

See also
 Islam in Puerto Rico

References

External links

 

1992 establishments in Puerto Rico
Mosques completed in 1992
Mosques in Puerto Rico
Vega Alta, Puerto Rico